Iryna Brémond was the defending champion, but chose not to participate.

Aravane Rezaï won the title defeating Yvonne Meusburger in the final 6–3, 2–6, 6–3.

Seeds

Draw

Finals

Top half

Bottom half

References 
Main Draw
Qualifying Draw

Open 88 Contrexeville - Singles